St. Pius X College is  a government aided post-graduate higher educational institution in Rajapuram, Kasaragod district of Kerala, India. It was established in 1995. The college is re-accredited by the National Assessment and Accreditation Council with 'A' grade and affiliated to Kannur University.

Motto 
"Pro Dea Et Popula" - "For God and People"

Vision 
"To be a centre of excellence affordable to a common man"

Mission 
"To be a beacon of eternal inspiration, to be the wheel within wheels to fulfill the aspirations of students, staff, alumni and the society at large"

Organization
The college is managed by the corporate management of the Diocese of Kottayam.

Programmes Offered 

 MA Development Economics
 BA Development Economics
 BBA
 B.Com.

 B.Sc. Life Science (Zoology) and Computational Biology
 B.Sc. Microbiology
 B.Sc. Physics

Sports, clubs and traditions 
The campus has two National Service Scheme units and an army wing of the National Cadet Corps. The Physical Education Department is specialised in kabaddi, basketball and boxing.

The College Union oversees all of the college's clubs, which include Fine Arts Club, Tourism Club, Entrepreneurship Development Club, Yoga Club, Science Club, and Agape Club. The Career and Placement Cell and Women's Cell assist students in those areas and literary pursuits are served by a forum named Sargasangamam and its two publications.

Gallery

External links

St. Pius X College, college website
piusgiri.ning.com, alumni network

Catholic universities and colleges in India
Arts and Science colleges in Kerala
Colleges in Kasaragod district
Educational institutions established in 1995
1995 establishments in Kerala
Colleges affiliated to Kannur University